Mohamed Abdallah Hossein (born 18 September 1998), sometimes known as Muhamed Zurga, or Mohamed Babiker, is a Sudanese professional footballer who plays as a midfielder for the Sudanese club Al-Merrikh, and the Sudan national team.

International career
Born in Khartoum, Omer made his international debut with the Sudan national team in a 3–2 friendly loss to Ethiopia on 30 December 2021. He was part of the Sudan squad that was called up for the 2021 Africa Cup of Nations.

References

External links
 
 

1998 births
Living people
Sudanese footballers
People from Khartoum
Sudan international footballers
Association football midfielders
Sudan Premier League players
Al-Merrikh SC players
2021 Africa Cup of Nations players